Hanna Czeczott  (3 January 1888 – 17 March 1982) was a Polish botanist, and paleobiologist. She was award the Order of the Banner of Work.

Life 
She was born in Saint Petersburg. She graduated from the Geographical Institute of Petersburg.

In 1910, she married mining engineer Henryk Czeczott. In 1935, she met William Culp Darrah at a European Conference. She worked at the Museum of the Earth.  She studied Miocene flora fossils, and Baltic amber. Her botanical collections are held at the University of Warsaw

Works 

 A Contribution to the knowledge of the flora and vegetation of Turkey Verlag des Repertoriums, 1938

References 

20th-century Polish botanists
1888 births
1982 deaths
Paleobiologists
Women botanists
University of Warsaw
Miocene
Baltic amber
20th-century Polish women scientists